Donnie Eichar is an American film producer, director and author. As an author he is best known for his The New York Times best-selling book, Dead Mountain: The Untold True Story of the Dyatlov Pass Incident in 2013. He is known for producing the TV series Killing Fields in 2016, the documentary film Soaked in Bleach in 2015, and producing the TV series The Buried Life in 2010. He is represented by William Morris Endeavor.

Early life 
Eichar grew up in Indian Rocks Beach, Florida before moving to Hollywood to pursue a career in the film industry.

Film career 
Eichar began his directorial career shooting documentary films with his first being the 2003 documentary, Blind Faith, which premiered at the Seattle International Film Festival. He remained focused on this subject with his second documentary in 2006, Seeing With Sound, which won a silver at The Telly Awards in 2007. In 2008, he wrote and directed a third documentary on blindness, which was titled Victory Over Darkness. It premiered at the Heartland film festival.

In 2006, Eichar was a director, writer, and producer for The Dangerous Sports Club, The Bug Wrangler, Dan Eldon Lives and Queen of Scream.  All four films aired on Current TV, an American TV network owned by Al Gore, Joel Hyatt and Ronald Burkle.

In 2010, Eichar began working for MTV as a producer for the documentary series, The Buried Life. The show received two nominations for VH1's Do Something Awards. Eichar served as a producer on the show for two seasons.

In late 2013, Eichar completed the non-fiction book Dead Mountain: The Untold True Story of the Dyatlov Pass Incident. Eichar came across the story of the Dyatlov Pass incident while carrying out research for an unrelated project. Eichar initially had plans to make a documentary but after traveling to Yekaterinburg for research he decided to author a book instead. After securing a book deal with Chronicle Books, Eichar made a second trip to the location of the incident in the Russian Ural Mountains, uncovering new evidence. The book is a reversed engineered investigation of the un-witnessed tragedy.

Later in 2013, Eichar was invited to Google to present and answer questions as part of an at GoogleTalks episode. He was also a guest on Coast to Coast AM and was interviewed by George Noory on the subject. In 2014, he was interviewed by National Geographic about Dead Mountain and the evidence that he found.

Following the release of his first book, it was announced by Variety that the book would be turned into a movie. The makers of Transcendence, which starred Johnny Depp, would be involved in the making of the film. The announcement came in July 2015, with Eichar listed as one of the Executive Producers for the feature film.

In 2015, Eichar produced and wrote the documentary film Soaked in Bleach, which studied the events preceding and surrounding the death of Kurt Cobain as seen through the perspective of private investigator Tom Grant. The film controversially explored the premise that Kurt Cobain's death was not a suicide. Soaked in Bleach had a limited theatrical release, despite statements that Courtney Love attempted to thwart the film release with cease and desist orders sent to all the theatres slated to show the film. The film was also distributed by Netflix after its limited theatrical release.

In 2015, Eichar was the executive producer for Discovery Channel's true crime show, The Killing Fields. It explores the unsolved murder case of Louisiana State University graduate student, Eugenie Boisfontaine of Iberville Parish, Louisiana. In the premiere season, the original detective assigned to the case over 20 years ago gets reinstated to solve his decades-old cold case using modern technology. Deadline announced that 2.4 million viewers viewed the season finale. The Killing Fields received an 80% favorable reviews on Rotten Tomatoes. The Los Angeles Times reviewed the first season as, 'It's the smaller, unvarnished, passing moments that sell the show – where its particular poetry, and even its comedy, can be found. The New York Times also gave the show a favorable review.

Eichar was also the creator, executive producer and writer for a LMN Network pilot titled, The Body Detective. The show was based around renowned American forensic Pathologist Dr. Cyril Wecht's views of a 1997 murder case in which his findings was able to overturn the case from accidental death to murder.

Eichar was a show runner and executive producer of People Magazine Investigates, a 10-part one-hour weekly true crime series focusing on the stories behind headlines, emphasizing the impact on families, potential new evidence and interviews. The two-hour, two-part opener focused on the Long Island serial killer case. When it premiered on Investigation Discovery in November 2016, it reached 4 million viewers.

Dead Mountain 
Is the first published book by Eichar. The book is an investigative book based on the events that took place at the Dyatlov Pass incident in 1959. It follows the footsteps of a team of nine hikers—seven men and two women—who were attempting to reach a Grade III in hiking. This grade was a common exercise for hikers that lived in the Soviet Union at the time. After setting up camp, all nine hikers mysteriously died, with a lot of strange evidence left behind.

Eichar retraced the steps of the nine Russian hikers to try and reach a conclusion as to why the men and women had died, or what had killed them. His investigation was written into the book, Dead Mountain: The Untold True Story of the Dyatlov Pass Incident, and was released in 2013. The book received mainly positive reviews following its release. Good Reads had over 2,500 ratings of the book with an average score of 4 out of 5.

The New York Times listed Dead Mountain as one of their best sellers in April 2015. The average of the Amazon reviews were 4.3 out of 5, with over 500 customer reviews. The final review and one of the most positive came from Booklist, "a gripping book, at least as dramatic as Krakauer's Into Thin Air."

Personal life 
Eichar lives in Malibu, California with his wife Julia Ortiz. He is an avid surfer and martial artist, with a known interest in Kajukenbo.

References 

American non-fiction writers
American documentary film directors
Film producers from California
Television producers from California
American television writers
People from Malibu, California
People from Florida
Living people
Film directors from California
Screenwriters from California
Year of birth missing (living people)